Greg Brooks may refer to:
Greg Brooks (American football) (born 1980), former American football cornerback for the Cincinnati Bengals
Greg Brooks (artist), American comic-book artist
Greg Brooks, singer/dancer in Prince's Revolution
Greg Brooks, publisher of Kansas City-based newspaper The Monitor

See also
Gregory Brooks, American poker player